Elizabeth Green may refer to:

Elizabeth Shippen Green (1871–1954), American illustrator
Elizabeth Green the Stork Woman, American sideshow performer
Elizabeth Underwood (c. 1790–1858), née Green
Liz Green, radio presenter
Beth Green (The Bill), The Bill character
Beth Green (photographer) (born 1949), American photographer
Betsy Brannon Green (born 1958), mystery/suspense novelist

See also
 Eliza Green, poet
 Elizabeth Greene (disambiguation)